Diego Sosa full name Diego Roberto Sosa (born 17 April 1980 in Buenos Aires), is a retired Argentine footballer.

References

External links
 
 
 

1980 births
Living people
Argentine footballers
Argentine expatriate footballers
Footballers from Buenos Aires
Association football defenders
Rocha F.C. players
Club Atlético River Plate (Montevideo) players
San Martín de San Juan footballers
Club Atlético Fénix players
Deportivo Español footballers
Flandria footballers
Argentine expatriate sportspeople in Uruguay
Expatriate footballers in Uruguay